Sameer Choudhary (born 19 December 1999) is an Indian cricketer. He made his Twenty20 debut on 11 November 2019, for Uttar Pradesh in the 2019–20 Syed Mushtaq Ali Trophy. He made his List A debut on 20 February 2021, for Uttar Pradesh in the 2020–21 Vijay Hazare Trophy.

References

External links
 

1999 births
Living people
Indian cricketers
Uttar Pradesh cricketers
Place of birth missing (living people)